Sébastien Jean Maurice Cauet (born 28 April 1972 in Saint-Quentin), better known as the mononym Cauet, is a well-known French radio and TV host, comedian, imitator, singer, DJ and record producer. He has worked at various times as host on TF1, Europe 2, Fun Radio, Skyrock, Virgin Radio and NRJ.

He is the founder and president of Cauet Groupe (renamed Be Aware Groupe) since 2003. Important shows hosted by Cauet on French television include CaueTivi (2003-2004), La Méthode Cauet (2003-2008), La Cauetidienne (2008), Ça va s'Cauet (2010) and Bienvenue chez Cauet (2011-2013). He is also radio host of radio shows Le morning de Cauet (2001-2009) and C'Cauet (2010 until present). He also did French language voiceover for various films. Véronique Richebois published a biography on Cauet titled Sébastien Cauet: Le côté obscur de la farce.

References

French radio presenters
French television presenters
French impressionists (entertainers)
French parodists
French comedy musicians
Parody musicians
1972 births
Living people
People from Saint-Quentin, Aisne